Benoît Carrara (7 May 1926 – 28 February 1993) was a French cross-country skier who competed in the late 1940s and early 1950s. He finished 77th in the 18 km event and 11th in the 50 km event at the 1952 Winter Olympics in Oslo. He also competed at the 1948 Winter Olympics, 1956 Winter Olympics and the 1960 Winter Olympics. He was born in Hauteville-Lompnes.

References

External links
18 km Olympic cross country results: 1948-52
Olympic 50 km cross country skiing results: 1948-64
 
 
 Mention of Benoît Carrara's death

1926 births
1993 deaths
Olympic cross-country skiers of France
Cross-country skiers at the 1948 Winter Olympics
Cross-country skiers at the 1952 Winter Olympics
Cross-country skiers at the 1956 Winter Olympics
Cross-country skiers at the 1960 Winter Olympics
French male cross-country skiers
Sportspeople from Ain
20th-century French people